Sanitek Armenia was a branch of Sanitek International Group – a multinational waste management company headquartered in Lebanon, with strategic alliances in Asia, Europe, and at the United States. Sanitek International was founded in September 2010 in Beirut, and started its operations at Yerevan, the capital of Armenia in December 2014.

Operations in Armenia 
Sanitek won the international competition announced by the mayor of Yerevan Taron Margaryan, who initiated the tender to address the long lasting problem of inappropriate and poor garbage collection institution in Yerevan. The company initially invested 10 million euros and employed 150 workers to conduct its operations in several districts of Yerevan. By the end of the year 2015 the company's investments were expected to reach around 20 million euros, and the number of job openings by the company were expected to reach 1100 people. Consequently, Sanitek started to operate at 11 administrative districts of Yerevan out of 12, including Arabkir, Nubarashen, Nor Nork and Erebouni.

Services 
Sanitek provides wide range of services associated with the waste management, including: sanitary cleaning, garbage collection, winter maintenance, composting, incineration, construction and operation of solid and healthcare waste facilities, construction and management of sanitary landfills.

Corporate structure and leadership 
In December 2014 Sanitek presented Madlen El Bolbol as the head of the Armenian branch of Sanitek company. In August 2015 the company was already presenting one of the shareholders of the company Nicholas Tawil. Later he holds the position of Partner and CEO of Sanitek company up to date.

Challenges and criticism 
In summer 2015 the series of mass protests broke in Yerevan publicly known as Electric Yerevan and Sanitek's garbage bins were used as barricades by the demonstrators causing a considerable damage to the company.

During spring and summer 2016 the company reportedly addressed its kind requests to the citizen of Yerevan asking them do not burn or damage Sanitek's bins at the different administrative districts of Yerevan.

Sanitek also faces extra work loads in the city of Yerevan due to common practice of throwing the garbage at places inappropriate for garbage.

Philanthropy and social participation 
In April 2016 Sanitek joined several other companies which provide public services in Yerevan to send a humanitarian aid to Nagorno-Karabakh.

References 

Sanitek Armenia
Environment of Armenia
Waste companies established in 2010